The Macau women's national under-18 basketball team is a national basketball team of Macau and is governed by the Macau - China Basketball Association. 

It represents the country in international under-18 (under age 18) women's basketball competitions.

See also
Macau women's national basketball team
Macau women's national under-16 basketball team
Macau men's national under-18 basketball team

References

External links
 Archived records of Macau team participations

Basketball in Macau
Basketball teams in Macau
Women's national under-18 basketball teams
Basketball
Women's sport in Macau